CFPL may refer to:

 CFPL (AM), a radio station (980 AM) licensed to serve London, Ontario, Canada
 CFPL-FM, a radio station (95.9 FM) licensed to serve London
 CFPL-DT, a television station (channel 10) licensed to serve London
 Commonwealth Financial Planning Limited, a division of the Commonwealth Bank, Australia